The Devil's Double is a 2011 English-language Belgian–Dutch film directed by Lee Tamahori, written by Michael Thomas, and starring Dominic Cooper in the dual role of Uday Hussein and Latif Yahia. It was released on 22 January 2011 at the 2011 Sundance Film Festival and was released in limited theaters on 29 July 2011 by Lionsgate and Herrick Entertainment.

Plot
In 1987, Latif Yahia (Dominic Cooper), an Iraqi soldier fighting in the Iran–Iraq War, is called to become a "fedai" ("body double" or political decoy) for Uday Hussein (also played by Cooper), the playboy son of Iraqi president Saddam Hussein (Philip Quast). Latif comes from an upper-class family and had attended school with Uday, where the other students would remark on their likeness. Latif initially refuses the position. Angered by his refusal, Uday has Latif imprisoned and tortured with Latif ultimately relenting when his family is threatened. Latif undergoes minor cosmetic surgery to perfect his resemblance to Uday and practices emulating the young Hussein's mannerisms and wildly volatile persona. He is given access to all of the luxurious benefits of the Husseins' fortune, including massive palaces, expensive wardrobes and Uday's Ferrari and various other exotic cars. Latif tries to resist Uday's exorbitant merrymaking and erratic behavior, at one point fleeing a nightclub in another of Uday's Ferraris to attempt to see his family, who believe he has died in the war. However, he is apprehended by Uday's bodyguards and savagely beaten by Uday. After an appearance at a conference with several Kuwaiti leaders, an attempt is made on Uday's (Latif's) life, apparently by a member of a rebel opposition group, possibly a Kurd. The real Uday, though, is more concerned with the Kuwaitis, who he believes have been slant drilling into Iraq's Rumaila oil field. The First Gulf War is launched with Uday proclaiming "The Age of the Sheikhs is over!"

Uday's increasingly violent, sadistic tendencies are displayed when he kidnaps a 14-year-old school girl and forces her to escort him to a party. At the party, based on an actual 1988 celebration honoring Egyptian President Hosni Mubarak's wife Suzanne, Uday becomes enraged with his father's personal bodyguard Kamel Hana Gegeo (Mehmet Ferda). Uday believes Gegeo facilitated an affair between Saddam and Samira Shahbandar, which devastated his mother, Sajida Talfah, and he also expresses jealousy at the trust his father places in Kamel Hana. When Gegeo passes sarcastic comments about Uday's sexual advances towards his young victim and drunkenly fires an AK-47 in the air repeatedly, Uday butchers him with an electric carving knife in front of all of the guests. The next morning, Uday's bodyguards are seen dumping the partially naked, beaten body of the young girl. Saddam, angered by what his son has done, shows up to the hospital where Uday had overdosed on sleeping pills and is beaten and nearly castrated by Saddam. Only the intervention of a doctor saves Uday from nearly being killed. As the Gulf War is in full swing, Latif tries to distance himself from Uday and begins an affair with Sarrab (Ludivine Sagnier), one of Uday's lovers.

Latif, acting as Uday, is later sent to Basra to rally support among Republican Guard soldiers as Coalition forces have taken control of the war. During the speech, Uday calls his brother from his mother's bedroom, playfully challenging him to tell the difference between Latif and Uday; his brother succinctly replies that he can tell: "He's sober and he's not foaming at the mouth." At Basra, another attempt is made on Latif's life. To Uday's great concern, Latif nearly loses a little finger in the assault, which presumably would mean Uday would have to have his own little finger amputated to maintain their resemblance. Uday angrily shows up at the hospital and threatens to slaughter the entire hospital if they fail to save his finger. Fortunately, the doctors succeed in saving Latif's finger. Afterwards, Uday accompanied by his bodyguards and Latif, crash a wedding where Uday viciously rapes and beats the bride who kills herself right after. Latif, at his breaking point assaults Uday when he shows indifference but is corralled by Uday's guards who threaten to kill him. Uday stops them and gleefully tells Latif "I will never let you go"! Later, Latif is confronted by the father of the young girl Uday killed. Uday eavesdrops on the conversation and is outraged by the man's pleas for "justice" and "compassion." Uday orders Latif to kill the man, but Latif refuses and instead slits his own wrists, to Uday's amusement. He is dumped half-dead on his family's front door where he shocks them with him still being alive. While he recovers, his father tells Latif that no matter what he has done or what happened he is proud of him and trusts him. After Latif recovers, he confronts Uday at his birthday party. The confrontation escalates to a shootout and Latif escapes in Uday's Mercedes with Sarrab . The two escape to Valletta, but Sarrab, fearing for her daughter in Iraq, calls Uday begging for the chance to return without being harmed. A would-be assassin sent by Uday just misses shooting Latif almost as soon as they arrive on the island. Angered by Sarrab's carelessness, he washes his hands of her. Uday calls Latif and offers him one final chance to return to Iraq, threatening to kill his father if he refuses. Latif's father encourages him not to return and he is killed.

However, Latif does return to Iraq, not to continue to serve as Uday's double, but rather to kill him, with the help of the man whose bride killed herself after being raped and beaten by Uday on her wedding day. In an adapted version of the attempt on Uday's life made by the 15th Shaaban in 1996, Latif and his partner ambush Uday while he is attempting to lure young girls into his Porsche. Although his partner is killed, they manage to wound him severely, including mangling his genitals with a direct shot. One of Uday's bodyguards catches up to Latif as he flees the scene. However the guard, Ali, is one who Latif could have killed as he fled from Uday's birthday party before leaving the country but spared, and the guard extends him the same courtesy.

The film ends by stating that Latif has been a very difficult man to find after these events. [In truth, Latif is readily available to give interviews from his new home in Ireland.]  Uday was permanently handicapped by the attack but survived until his killing by U.S. forces in 2003.

Cast
 Dominic Cooper as Latif Yahia / Uday Hussein
 Philip Quast as Saddam Hussein
 Mem Ferda as Kamel Hana
 Dar Salim as Azzam Al-Tikriti
 Jamie Harding as Qusay Hussein
 Ludivine Sagnier as Sarrab
 Mimoun Oaïssa as Ali
 Akin Gazi as Saleeh
 Amrita Acharia as School Girl
 Frida Cauchi as Sajida Talfah	
 Raad Rawi as Munem
 Khalid Laith as Yassem Al-Helou
 Pano Masti as Said Kammuneh
 Nasser Memarzia as Latif's father
 Tiziana Azzopardi as Latif's sister
 Abner Fabbro as Soldier

Production
The film was shot in Jordan and Malta.

Reception

Critical response
The film received mixed reviews. The movie has a 52% rating on Rotten Tomatoes, though much critical acclaim has been given to Dominic Cooper's dual role. IGN awarded it 3.5 out of 5 and said "certainly a fresh perspective on one of the Middle East's most brutal dictators". CinemaBlend.com also awarded it 3.5 out of five and said "and while the film feels deeply flawed, Cooper is worth the price of admission." Rockstar Weekly awarded the film a positive review, saying "Hats off to director Lee Tamahori (Die Another Day) for taking a controversial topic and turning it into a masterful film." However, the Los Angeles Times gave the film a negative review, saying "The story of Uday Hussein's body double is relentlessly violent and lurid". Roger Ebert awarded the film three out of four stars and said "All due praise to Dominic Cooper. It should have been more."

Accolades

References

External links

The Devil's Double at Official site

2011 films
2011 thriller drama films
Belgian thriller drama films
Dutch thriller drama films
2010s English-language films
English-language Belgian films
English-language Dutch films
Thriller films based on actual events
Films based on non-fiction books
Films directed by Lee Tamahori
Films set in Iraq
Films set in Baghdad
Films shot in Malta
Films set in the 1980s
Films set in the 1990s
Gulf War films
Iran–Iraq War films
Lionsgate films
Films shot in Jordan
2011 drama films
Cultural depictions of Saddam Hussein